Oru Kochu Bhoomikulukkam is a 1992 Indian Malayalam-language film, directed by Chandrasekharan. The film stars Sreenivasan, Siddique, Monisha, Shobhana, Jagadish and Prem Kumar . The film's score is by S. P. Venkatesh.

Synopsis
Protagonist Hari (Sreenivasan) works in a bank and leads a blissful life. His buddy, Ravi (Siddique), is a factory manager. Ravi seeks a bride and decides on Indu (Shobhana). This rattles Hari, as he and Indu had studied at the same college. Hari fears that Indu will disclose his past and certain incidents that happened in college to his wife, Viji (Monisha). Hari tries to persuade Ravi to change his mind about marrying Indu and when he doesn't succeed tries to spread rumors about Indu to Ravi and vice versa to stop the marriage. His efforts are not successful. He wants to shift from his present house to avoid Indu after Ravi's marriage but his wife doesn't agree. He relies upon his childhood friend, Constable Purushothaman (Jagadish), to aid him. Purushothaman's miscalculated plans get him in trouble. Later to escape the mire, Purushothaman reveals the truth to Ravi, Indu and to the throng. This affects Hari's life. Purushothaman takes an initiative to solve the dispute between the families. Meanwhile, Hari and Viji divorce. Purushothaman, finally clears the air and resolves the misunderstanding. The film ends with Hari, Viji, Ravi and Indu going off on their honeymoon trip accompanied by Jagadish as the driver.

Cast

Sreenivasan as Hari
Monisha as Viji, Hari's wife
Siddique as Ravi, Hari's friend
Shobhana as Adv. Indu, Ravi's wife
Jagadish as Constable Purushothaman, Hari's friend
Philomina as Ravi's grandmother
Sai Kumar as Adv. Abdul Salim, Indu's Classmate 
Shyama as Thankamani
Mamukkoya as Thankappan, Thief
Oduvil Unnikrishnan as Dentist
Swapna Ravi as Dentist's wife
Karamana Janardanan Nair as Bharghavan Pillai, Viji's Father 
Kottayam Santha as Viji's Mother 
Prem Kumar as Snake charmer
N. F. Varghese as Bank Manager 
Kanakalatha as Soudhamini,  Ravi's Maid
Mohan Jose

Soundtrack
The music was composed by S. P. Venkatesh with lyrics by P. K. Gopi.

References

External links
 

1992 films
1990s Malayalam-language films